The Bristol SU was a single-decker bus and single-decker coach chassis built by Bristol Commercial Vehicles between 1960 and 1966. The bodies for these vehicles were built by Eastern Coach Works (ECW). Some of them were built as medium length chassis, whereas most of them were built as full length chassis.

Design
The Bristol SU ("small, underfloor-engined") chassis featured the same Albion EN250 engine and BMC rear axle as the Albion Nimbus NS3AN with a David Brown overdrive-top five-speed constant-mesh gearbox and a front axle by Kirkstall.  The major difference from the Nimbus was that the radiator was mounted at the extreme front of the chassis. EWT 386C (West Yorkshire's SMA17) was later rebuilt with a Perkins H6.354 5.8-litre engine to test its design for use in the Bristol LH, which superseded the SU as Bristol's lightweight chassis.

A forward entrance was provided opposite the driver's position. Seats were forward-facing in pairs, but where wheel arches protruded above the floor of the bus body, the seats were turned sideways to give sufficient leg room.

Operators

The SUs were concentrated in the south-west of England, with 73% of them being built for the shared fleet of Southern National and Western National (Southern National was formally merged into Western National in 1969). The remainder were sold to six other companies that were owned by the Transport Holding Company.

The original operators generally kept their SUs running until the 1970s (Western National's last examples were withdrawn in 1979), afterwards selling many of them to independent operators such as Guernsey Motors. The last one in regular service was 280 KTA (originally Western National 430) which was operated by the Tillingbourne Bus Company until May 2000.

Preservation
16 Bristol SUs are known to be in preservation: 3 SUS, 6 SUL buses and 7 SUL coaches, although some of the later had their bodies modified in service to make them suitable for operating bus services.  The SUL buses include EWT 386C, the Perkins-engined example. 416 HDV was driven from the United Kingdom to India. It then returned to the UK and was then taken to USA and Canada before being sold to a preservationist in Mexico.

At least five other Southern and Western National SULs survive, most of which have been converted to motor homes: buses 341 EDV, 351 EDV and EDV 531D; coaches 925 GUO and 276 KTA.

References

SU
Bus chassis
Coaches (bus)
Midibuses
Step-entrance buses